Havering may mean:

The London Borough of Havering
Havering-atte-Bower, a place in that borough
The Royal Liberty of Havering, a historical entity, surrounding Havering Palace, from which the borough was named
In Scottish English, haver (from the Scots havers (oats)) means "to maunder; to talk foolishly; to chatter," as heard in the song "I'm Gonna Be (500 Miles)" by The Proclaimers
In British English elsewhere, haver means "to hum and haw; to be indecisive"